is a series of 2.5D stage plays co-produced by Marvelous Entertainment, Nitroplus, DMM.com and Toho based on the online browser game Touken Ranbu. The plays were screenplay and directed by Kenichi Suemitsu. The plays were first announced in 2015 at the same time as Musical: Touken Ranbu and features a different cast and production crew.

Production history

The first stage play, ran from May 3, 2016 to May 20, 2016. The play was also live-streamed in 60 theaters in Taiwan and Hong Kong on May 20, 2016, with over 40,000 people in attendance. The success of the play led to a separate re-run of Kyoden: Moyuru Honnoji, revived under the name , which took place from December 15, 2016 to January 17, 2017.

, ran from June 1, 2017, to July 14, 2017.

, ran from December 15, 2017 to December 29, 2017.

 ran from June to July 2018.

 ran from February 2 to February 12 in Tokyo and February 16 to February 19 in Osaka.[15] The play is the first Touken Ranbu stage with former Takarazuka Revue otokoyaku (male role) in the core formation and all-female cast including the ensemble.

Principal cast and characters

Main cast

Critical reception

Approximately 40,000 people watched the final show of Kyoden: Moyuru Honnoji on May 20, 2016. The Blu-ray release of Kyoden: Moyuru Honnoji debuted at #1 on the Oricon Weekly Blu-ray Charts sold 24,175 copies in its first week, while the DVD release debuted at #2 on the Oricon Weekly DVD Charts with 18,242 copies.

Discography

Soundtrack albums

References

2016 plays
2017 plays
2018 plays
2.5D musicals
Works based on Internet-based works

External links
 Official website